Josh Carraway (born April 13, 1994) is a former American football outside linebacker. He was drafted by the Tennessee Titans in the seventh round of the 2017 NFL Draft. He played college football at TCU.

College career
Carraway was named All-Big 12 Conference his final two years of college.  He led his team with 9.5 sacks as a junior, and recorded eleven tackles for loss while leading his Texas Christian University team with eight quarterback sacks as a senior.

Professional career

Tennessee Titans
Carraway was drafted by the Tennessee Titans in the seventh round, 227th overall, in the 2017 NFL Draft. On May 12, 2017, the Titans signed Carraway to a four-year, $2.48 million contract that also includes a signing bonus of $87,086. He was waived on October 3, 2017, and was re-signed to the practice squad. He was promoted back to the active roster on December 9, 2017.

On September 1, 2018, Carraway was waived by the Titans.

Washington Redskins
On November 26, 2018, Carraway was signed to the Washington Redskins practice squad.

Los Angeles Rams
On May 2, 2019, Carraway signed with the Los Angeles Rams. He suffered a torn Achilles in the preseason and was ruled out for the season. He was waived/injured during final roster cuts on August 31, 2019, and reverted to the team's injured reserve list the next day.

References

External links
TCU Horned Frogs bio

1994 births
Living people
American football defensive ends
American football outside linebackers
Los Angeles Rams players
People from Flower Mound, Texas
Players of American football from Texas
Sportspeople from the Dallas–Fort Worth metroplex
TCU Horned Frogs football players
Tennessee Titans players
Washington Redskins players